CODA Automotive Inc. was a privately held American company headquartered in Los Angeles, California. The company designed and assembled lithium-iron phosphate (LiFePO4) battery systems for automotive and power storage utility applications, and electric cars. Miles Automotive partnered with Hafei and Qingyuan Electric Vehicle to establish Coda Automotive as an affiliate company. The name CODA comes from the musical term for the concluding passage of a piece of music. CODA Automotive has said that it chose the name because its electric vehicle technology represents an end for combustion engine vehicles, and the start of the electric vehicle era.

In June 2009, CODA announced the creation and funding of LIO Energy Systems, a global joint-venture with Lishen Power Battery. LIO Energy Systems was formed with the purpose of designing, manufacturing, and selling battery systems for electric vehicles and utility applications. LIO Energy Systems will supply battery systems to CODA Automotive for use in the all-electric CODA, to other automotive OEMs globally, and to renewable energy producers, utilities and other power storage customers.  LIO Energy Systems was later renamed CODA Energy.

After low initial sales of the Coda Car, Coda Automotive terminated 15% of its workforce, and entered a period of financial difficulty. By May 2013, Coda was seeking bankruptcy protection. By May 2016, Exergonix, Inc. acquired all assets of the company.

Corporate strategy and partners

CODA Automotive's goal is to accelerate the adoption of electric vehicles, and renewable energy technology globally. To this end, CODA has focused on improving performance, safety, reducing cost, and commercializing production of battery systems built for automotive applications, which it views as the "chief enabling technology" for all-electric cars. To reduce the cost of building its vehicles, CODA controls all core design, and engineering work internally while partnering with established automotive manufacturers, and suppliers around the world. CODA's supply chain partners include BorgWarner, UQM Technologies, EnergyCS, Continental Automotive Systems, Porsche Design Studios, Delphi, Celgard, Novolyte Technologies, OMITEC, Lear, Hella, Hafei, and Lishen. In total, CODA has more than thirty suppliers, and partners on four continents. In March 2012, Chinese car maker Great Wall Motors formed a joint venture with Coda.

Products

Coda all-electric car

CODA's first car is an all-electric four-door, five passenger battery electric vehicle (BEV), the CODA sedan. The car is powered by a 31 kWh lithium ion iron phosphate (LiFePO4) battery pack that is substantially larger than that of other vehicles in its class. EPA's rated the Coda's combined fuel economy at 73 miles per gallon gasoline equivalent(). The car is backed by a 3-year, 36,000 mile limited warranty and the battery system is backed by a 10-year, 100,000 mile limited warranty.

CODA announced that net price will be  before any electric vehicle federal tax credit, and other state and local incentives that are available in the U.S.  Initial deliveries of the vehicle were planned for December 2010, but were pushed back to the second half of 2011 as CODA decided to have more time available to ensure the quality of the car, and later were again rescheduled for late 2011. The latest market launch was slated for February 2012, but the first deliveries to retail customers in the United States took place in March 2012. Initially the electric car is available only in California.

Battery production and distribution joint-venture

CODA has a global joint-venture with Lishen Power Battery, a global battery cell supplier to Samsung, Motorola, and Apple, for the design, manufacture, and sale of battery systems called LIO Energy Systems. The name was selected because “LIO” is the reverse spelling of “oil.” Together, CODA and Lishen developed a lithium iron phosphate battery cell for transportation, and utility applications, which includes, renewable energy (wind and solar power) storage. LIO Energy Systems currently operates a manufacturing facility in Tianjin and plans to build a U.S. facility in Columbus, Ohio. Initially, the CODA will be the primary recipient of the battery systems produced by LIO. LIO's production capacity will total 1.4 billion amp hours in Tianjin, China at full scale. With the completion of the Ohio plant, total capacity will reach two billion Ah (6.3 million kWh) of energy storage.

In May 2010, U.S. Secretary of Commerce Gary Locke visited the LIO Energy Systems facility in Tianjin as part of the Obama administration's first cabinet-level trade mission to China. Commenting on the visit, Locke said, "International green technology partnerships can produce rapid job growth back home and deliver energy solutions abroad, and CODA's venture proves it."

Financial history and investors

Kevin Czinger and Miles Rubin founded Coda in 2009. Early funding raised .

Notable investors include, equity firms, Harbinger Capital Partners, Piper Jaffray, Riverstone Holdings, and personal investors, Henry "Hank" Paulson, John Bryson, Klaus Tschira, Les Wexner, Mack McLarty, Miles Rubin, Steven “Mac” Heller, and Tom Steyer.

Bankruptcy and legal issues
After selling approximately 100 Coda Cars in California, Coda filed for Chapter 11 bankruptcy protection on May 1, 2013. Coda Holdings stated that it expects to emerge from the bankruptcy process to focus solely on its subsidiary Coda Energy, and would abandon car manufacturing which is capital intensive.

Shortly after the bankruptcy announcement, former employee Tony Bulchak filed a class-action lawsuit against the automaker, alleging that Coda laid off 125 workers on December 14, 2012, without giving them a 60-day notice.

Awards
Lung disease advocacy group Breathe California named CODA a Clean Air Award winner in the technology development category on April 19, 2010.

Silicon Valley networking organization AlwaysOn selected CODA as one of the top privately held companies focused on green technology in its GoingGreen 100 list for 2010.

References

External links
 CODA Automotive
 CODA Energy

Vehicle manufacturing companies established in 2009
Vehicle manufacturing companies disestablished in 2016
Car manufacturers of the United States
Battery electric vehicle manufacturers
Plug-in hybrid vehicle manufacturers
Sports car manufacturers
Manufacturing companies based in Los Angeles
Electric vehicle manufacturers of the United States
Companies that filed for Chapter 11 bankruptcy in 2013
Motor vehicle manufacturers based in California
2009 establishments in California
2016 disestablishments in California